Economidichthys is a genus of freshwater gobies endemic to Greece. The name of this genus honours the Greek ichthyologist Panos Economidis.

Species
There are currently two recognized species in this genus:
 Economidichthys pygmaeus (Holly, 1929) (Western Greece goby)
 Economidichthys trichonis Economidis & P. J. Miller, 1990 (Trichonis dwarf goby)

References

 
Gobiinae
Taxonomy articles created by Polbot